The 2019 Indonesia Masters Super 100 (officially known as the Yuzu Indonesia Masters 2019 for sponsorship reasons) was a badminton tournament which took place at Ken Arok Sports Hall in Malang, Indonesia, from 1 to 6 October 2019 and had a total purse of $75,000.

Tournament
The 2019 Indonesia Masters Super 100 was the eighth Super 100 tournament of the 2019 BWF World Tour and also part of the Indonesia Masters Super 100 championships, which had been held since 2018. This tournament was organized by the Badminton Association of Indonesia and sanctioned by the BWF.

Venue
This international tournament was held at Ken Arok Sports Hall in Malang, East Java, Indonesia.

Point distribution
Below is the point distribution table for each phase of the tournament based on the BWF points system for the BWF Tour Super 100 event.

Prize money
The total prize money for this tournament was US$75,000. Distribution of prize money was in accordance with BWF regulations.

Men's singles

Seeds

 Loh Kean Yew (withdrew)
 Subhankar Dey (withdrew)
 Firman Abdul Kholik (second round)
 Kazumasa Sakai (second round)
 Tanongsak Saensomboonsuk (final)
 Ihsan Maulana Mustofa (second round)
 Chico Aura Dwi Wardoyo (second round)
 Sun Feixiang (champion)

Finals

Top half

Section 1

Section 2

Bottom half

Section 3

Section 4

Women's singles

Seeds

 Yeo Jia Min (first round)
 Ruselli Hartawan (quarter-finals)
 Zhang Yiman (second round)
 Porntip Buranaprasertsuk (final)
 Lyanny Alessandra Mainaky (first round)
 Nguyễn Thùy Linh (semi-finals)
 Ji Shuting (quarter-finals)
 Wang Zhiyi (champion)

Finals

Top half

Section 1

Section 2

Bottom half

Section 3

Section 4

Men's doubles

Seeds

 Fajar Alfian / Muhammad Rian Ardianto (second round)
 Berry Angriawan / Hardianto (semi-finals)
 Akira Koga / Taichi Saito (final)
 Mohamad Arif Abdul Latif / Nur Mohd Azriyn Ayub (quarter-finals)
 Ricky Karanda Suwardi / Angga Pratama (first round)
 Huang Kaixiang / Liu Cheng (semi-finals)
 Ou Xuanyi / Zhang Nan (champions)
 Keiichiro Matsui / Yoshinori Takeuchi (second round)

Finals

Top half

Section 1

Section 2

Bottom half

Section 3

Section 4

Women's doubles

Seeds

 Du Yue / Li Yinhui (withdrew)
 Li Wenmei / Zheng Yu (quarter-finals)
 Nami Matsuyama / Chiharu Shida (semi-finals)
 Della Destiara Haris / Rizki Amelia Pradipta (final)
 Naru Shinoya / Natsu Saito (second round)
 Yulfira Barkah / Agatha Imanuela (quarter-finals)
 Zhang Shuxian / Huang Jia (semi-finals)
 Zhou Chaomin / Chen Xiaofei (quarter-finals)

Finals

Top half

Section 1

Section 2

Bottom half

Section 3

Section 4

Mixed doubles

Seeds

 Chen Tang Jie / Peck Yen Wei (quarter-finals)
 Ren Xiangyu / Zhou Chaomin (second round)
 Danny Bawa Chrisnanta / Tan Wei Han (first round)
 Hoo Pang Ron / Cheah Yee See (quarter-finals)
 Adnan Maulana / Mychelle Crhystine Bandaso (final)
 Rehan Naufal Kusharjanto / Lisa Ayu Kusumawati (semi-finals)
 Supak Jomkoh / Supissara Paewsampran (second round)
 Guo Xinwa / Zhang Shuxian (champions)

Finals

Top half

Section 1

Section 2

Bottom half

Section 3

Section 4

References

External links
 Tournament Link

Indonesia Masters Super 100
Indonesia Masters Super 100
Indonesia Masters Super 100
Indonesia Masters Super 100